Petar Miloševski (6 December 1973 – 13 March 2014) was a Macedonian footballer who played as a goalkeeper.

International career
He made his senior debut for Macedonia in a March 1998 friendly match against Bulgaria and has earned a total of 59 caps, scoring no goals. His final international was a February 2009 friendly against Moldova.

Personal life
Miloševski was appointed sporting director of the Macedonia national team shortly after he ended his 22-year playing career.

Death
He died in a car accident near Kumanovo on 13 March 2014, after taking part in a charity futsal match there. Reportedly the car, which was driven by Macedonian Football Federation President Ilčo Gjorgioski, collided with a van from the opposite direction for unknown reasons on the Kriva Palanka-Kumanovo road. Gjorgioski and an unknown person came out injured.

References

External links
 
 Career history at Weltfussball.de  
 Profile at MacedonianFootball.com 

1973 births
2014 deaths
Sportspeople from Bitola
Road incident deaths in North Macedonia
Association football goalkeepers
Macedonian footballers
North Macedonia international footballers
FK Pelister players
FK Vardar players
Trabzonspor footballers
Malatyaspor footballers
Akçaabat Sebatspor footballers
Enosis Neon Paralimni FC players
Macedonian First Football League players
Süper Lig players
Cypriot First Division players
Macedonian expatriate footballers
Expatriate footballers in Turkey
Macedonian expatriate sportspeople in Turkey
Expatriate footballers in Cyprus
Macedonian expatriate sportspeople in Cyprus